The 2014 Sun Bowl was an American college football bowl game that was played on December 27, 2014, at Sun Bowl Stadium in El Paso, Texas.  In this 81st edition of the Sun Bowl, Arizona State from the Pac-12 Conference met Duke from the Atlantic Coast Conference. The game started at 12:00 noon MST, and was televised on CBS and heard on the Sports USA Radio Network.  It was one of the 2014–15 bowl games that will conclude the 2014 FBS football season.  The game was sponsored by the Hyundai Motor Company and was officially known as the Hyundai Sun Bowl.

Teams

Teams playing in this bowl were announced on December 7, 2014. This was the first meeting between these two teams.

Game summary

Scoring summary

Source:

Statistics

References

Sun Bowl
Sun Bowl
Arizona State Sun Devils football bowl games
Duke Blue Devils football bowl games
Sun Bowl
Sun Bowl